Garasia, alternatively spelled Girasia, Girasiya or Garasiya, is a title used by the Koli chieftains of petty states or Jagirdars in India who held the villages as Giras granted by rulers. Many of the Chunvalia Kolis held the title of Girasia and they worshipped the Hindu goddess Shakti.
 

 
The Koli Garasiya were tributary to the ruler of state who gave the Giras.

Social order 
Present-day Garasias are characterised by several social divisions with well-defined relationships. These divisions have appeared out of situations of culture contact and acculturation. Today Garasias are divided into Koli Garasia, Rajput Garasia, Dungri Garasia and Bhil Garasia.

See also 
 Molesalam Rajput, a Muslim community

References 

Bibliography

Further reading

External links 
 Gujarat: The Long Fifteenth Century and the Making of a Region by Aparna Kapadiya

Koli titles
Social groups of Rajasthan